The Lander County Courthouse, at 122 Main St. in Austin, Nevada, is a historic courthouse that was built of brick in 1871 with Greek Revival influence in its style.  It was designed by Daniel P. Bell.  It was listed on the National Register of Historic Places in 2003.

It served as courthouse from 1871 to 1979, when the court moved to a courthouse in Battle Mountain, and the building has since been used as county offices.

References 

Government buildings completed in 1871
Courthouses on the National Register of Historic Places in Nevada
Greek Revival architecture in Nevada
Buildings and structures in Lander County, Nevada
National Register of Historic Places in Lander County, Nevada
Austin, Nevada